Running is a gait of terrestrial locomotion, typically faster than walking.

Running or Runnin' may also refer to:

Film and television
 Running (film), a 1979 film
 "Running", an episode of Teletubbies
 "Running", an episode of Zoboomafoo

Music

Albums
 Running (The Desert Rose Band album) (1988)
 Running (Trapeze album) (1979)

Songs
 "Running" (James Bay song) (2016)
 "Running" (Sarah Brightman song) (2007)
 "Runnin" (21 Savage and Metro Boomin song), 2020
 "Runnin (BGYO and Keiko Necesario song) (2021)
 "Runnin (David Dallas song) (2013)
 "Runnin (Doman & Gooding song) (2009)
 "Running" (Evermore song) (2006)
 "Running" (Information Society song) (1985)
 "Running" (András Kállay-Saunders song) (2014)
 "Runnin' (Lose It All)", a 2015 song by Naughty Boy featuring Beyoncé and Arrow Benjamin
 "Running" (No Doubt song) (2003)
 "Runnin (The Pharcyde song)
 "Running" (Sandro song)
 "Runnin' (Dying to Live)", a 2002 song by 2Pac featuring The Notorious B.I.G.
 "Running" (Jessie Ware song) (2012)
 "Runnin", a 1993 song by Bass Bumpers
 "Running", a 2000 song by Alan Braxe and Fred Falke
 "Runnin, a 2000 song by Cher from not.com.mercial
 "Runnin, a 1977 song by Earth, Wind and Fire from All 'n All
 "Runnin, a 2005 song by Game featuring Tony Yayo, from The Documentary
 "Runnin, a 2012 song by Adam Lambert from Trespassing
 "Runnin, a 2010 song by Lil Wayne featuring Shanell, from Rebirth
 "Running", a 2013 song by Nine Inch Nails from Hesitation Marks
 "Runnin, a 2016 song by Pharrell Williams on the soundtrack of Hidden Figures
 "Runnin, a 2016 song by Relient K from Air for Free
 "Running", a 1982 song by Chubby Checker from "The Change Has Come"
 "Running", a 2001 song by Timothy B. Schmit from Feed the Fire

Other uses
 Running (sailing), a sailing term referring to movement relative to wind direction
 Chain (unit) or running distance, a distance from a fixed starting point

See also
 Run (disambiguation)
 Runner (disambiguation)
 Running man (disambiguation)
 Utah Utes men's basketball or Runnin' Utes